Blue Flag is a military aviation exercise held by the Israeli Air Force. It first took place in November 2013 at Ovda Air Force Base in Israel. The exercise, which included the participation of several foreign air forces, is aimed at expanding international cooperation. Plans on making "Blue Flag" a biennial event were realised in 2015 with another "Blue Flag" exercise in which the air forces of the United States, Greece and Poland also participated. The goal of the Blue Flag training exercise is to simulate extreme combat scenarios and coalition flights as realistically as possible.

In 2017 the exercise hosted air forces from the United States of America, Poland, Italy and Greece—and for the first time India, France and Germany participated as well.

The Royal Air Force of the United Kingdom took part in Blue Flag 2021, which was the first time they have openly trained in Israeli airspace.

References

Israeli Air Force
Military exercises involving Israel
Military aviation exercises